Norman Armitage (January 1, 1907, as Norman Cudworth Cohn, – March 14, 1972) was an American saber fencer.

Early life
Armitage, who was Jewish, was born in Albany, New York.

Fencing career

College
Armitage began fencing for the Columbia Lions fencing team when he was a student at Columbia University. He won the 1928 Intercollegiate Fencing Association sabre championship.

He later attended New York University Law School, where in 1937 he earned a law degree, and in 1939 he earned a Doctor of Jurisprudence degree in patent law.

National sabre championships
In won 10 times in 25 appearances at the national championships: in 1930, from 1934 to 1936, from 1939 to 1943, and in 1945. He holds 17 national championship titles, more than any other US sabre fencer.

Olympics
Armitage competed in six Olympics, 1928–36 and 1948–56, only taking a break for World War II. He competed in the Olympics over a 28-year span. He carried the U.S. flag in the Olympic opening ceremony in 1952, and 1956.

At the 1928 Summer Olympics, he competed (as Norman Cohn) in the individual and team events. The American team was eliminated in the first round, and Armitage reached the semifinals in individual sabre. At the 1932 Summer Olympics, he reached the finals in the team event and finished fourth. In individual sabre, he placed ninth.

Armitage competed at the 1936 Summer Olympics in spite of severe chemical burns on his right hand suffered in January of that year. (He was a chemical engineer and later a patent attorney.) He reached the semifinals in individual sabre, and placed fifth in the team sabre event.

He won his only medal, a bronze, at the 1948 Summer Olympics, in the team sabre event.

At the 1952 Summer Olympics, Armitage competed in the team sabre event but not the individual sabre. They finished fourth.

Hall of Fame
Armitage was the first person to be inducted into the USFA Hall of Fame, in 1963.

See also
List of athletes with the most appearances at Olympic Games
List of select Jewish fencers

References

External links
 
"Ivies in Athens"

1907 births
1972 deaths
American male sabre fencers
Jewish male sabre fencers
Jewish American sportspeople
Columbia Lions fencers
Fencers at the 1928 Summer Olympics
Fencers at the 1932 Summer Olympics
Fencers at the 1936 Summer Olympics
Fencers at the 1948 Summer Olympics
Fencers at the 1952 Summer Olympics
Fencers at the 1956 Summer Olympics
Olympic bronze medalists for the United States in fencing
Medalists at the 1948 Summer Olympics
Columbia College (New York) alumni
20th-century American Jews